Statistics of Campeonato da 1ª Divisão do Futebol in the 2005 season.

Overview
Polícia de Segurança Pública won the championship.

League standings

References
RSSSF

Campeonato da 1ª Divisão do Futebol seasons
Macau
Macau
1